Kareshk (also Romanized as Kāreshk; also known as Karsh and Kūreshk) is a village in Kakhk Rural District, Kakhk District, Gonabad County, Razavi Khorasan Province, Iran. At the 2006 census, its population was 54, in 22 families.

References 

Populated places in Gonabad County